Idle Woman (Spanish: La Perezosa) is a genre painting completed in oil on canvas by Peruvian painter Daniel Hernández Morillo in Lima, Peru.

Background and creation
Daniel Hernández Morillo, a Peruvian student of itinerant Italian painter Leonardo Barbieri, left his homeland for Europe in 1874. Although Europe was in the midst of an artistic renewal, Morillo remained influenced by the academic art movement and French rococo painting. This is reflected in the pastel tones and the lightness of Idle Woman, which was completed in 1906.

Provenance
The painting is currently held by the Museo de Arte de Lima, in Lima, Peru.

References

1906 paintings
Peruvian art
Paintings in Peru